Qatar Airways Company Q.C.S.C. (al-Qaṭariya), operating as Qatar Airways, is the state-owned flag carrier airline of Qatar. Headquartered in the Qatar Airways Tower in Doha, the airline operates a hub-and-spoke network, flying to over 150 international destinations across Africa, Asia, Europe, the Americas, and Oceania from its base at Hamad International Airport, using a fleet of more than 200 aircraft. Qatar Airways Group employs more than 43,000 people. The carrier has been a member of the Oneworld alliance since , the first Persian Gulf carrier to sign with one of the three major airline alliances.

History

Origin 
The State of Qatar was a joint-owner member of Gulf Air along with Oman, The UAE (only the Emirate of Abu Dhabi), and Kingdom of Bahrain, until May 2002, following its withdrawal. It became the first country among the three to withdraw from the Airline to solely focus on its own airline Qatar Airways, although it remained a member of the airline for six months after the government announced its complete withdrawal.

Foundation 
By this time the fleet consisted of  Airbus A310s that served a route network including Abu Dhabi, Bangkok, Cairo, Dubai, Khartoum, Kuwait, London, Madras, Manila, Muscat, Osaka, Sharjah, Taipei, Tokyo and Trivandrum. During ,  ex-All Nippon Airways Boeing 747s were bought from Boeing. The airline acquired a second-hand Boeing 747SP from Air Mauritius in 1996.
　

Flights to London were launched during . The airline also took delivery of two second-hand 231-seater Airbus A300-600R aircraft on lease from Ansett Worldwide Aviation Services (AWAS) during the year; they replaced two Boeing 747s. The entering of these two A300s into the fleet also marked the introduction of a new logo. A  A300-600R joined the fleet shortly afterwards, also on lease from AWAS.

In , Qatar Airways ordered an International Aero Engines V2500-powered Airbus A319CJ and took an option for another aircraft of the type. The airline became the Airbus A380  customer in  when  aircraft of the type were ordered, plus  options. Also that year, the airline resumed services to Jakarta. A year later, in May, Qatar withdrew from Gulf Air to ensure the development of its national airline. 

In , a Qatar Airways Airbus A320 was the first aircraft that resumed the international services to Iraq when it flew the Doha–Basra route. Also that month, Qatar Airways incorporated its first dedicated cargo aircraft to the fleet. It was an Airbus A300-600R that was converted to freighter in Germany for  million. The deal included  A330-200s and  -300s; it also included options for further  A330-300s and  A340-600s. During the year the airline started serving the Chinese market with the introduction of flights to Shanghai. During the 2003 Dubai Air Show the airline firmed up an earlier commitment for  Airbus A380s and took options for another  of these aircraft. The value of the transaction was  billion. It was also in 2003 that Qatar Airways became the first airline to be audited under the new IATA operational audit programme, IOSA.

The FY2004 saw the airline transporting 3.35 million passengers. Its first A340 was delivered on September 8, 2006.

The agreement was firmed up in  during the 2007 Paris Air Show;  more Airbus A380s were also made part of the order. In  the same year, during the unveiling ceremony of the Boeing 787 in Everett, Qatar Airways was recognised as a future customer for the type when its logo appeared on one side of the brand new aircraft. By that time, the airline had not acknowledged it had placed an order for a number of these new aircraft. In  the same year, a firm order for  Boeing 787-8s, plus options for  more aircraft of the –9 or –10 variant, was confirmed. The order also included  Boeing 777-300ERs,  Boeing 777-200LRs and  Boeing 777Fs, whereas  more aircraft of the type were on option. The combined order was valued at  billion. The airline took delivery of its first -seater Boeing 777-300ER in late . A new scheduled service to New York-JFK that commenced in  replaced the Newark route. On June 15 the same year, at the Paris Air Show, Qatar Airways ordered 20 Airbus A320 and 4 Airbus A321 aircraft worth $1.9bn. On October 12, 2009, the company completed the world's first commercial passenger flight powered by a fuel made from natural gas. Also in 2009, Qatar Airways launched its first scheduled flights to Australia with Melbourne being the first city served; routes to Chengdu, Hangzhou, Phnom Penh and Clark International Airport in the Philippines were launched during 2009 as well.

On May 18, 2010, the airline put its first Boeing 777F (A7-BFA) into service, with a flight from Doha to Amsterdam. The aircraft had been delivered on May 14, 2010. The airline has launched 22 new destinations since 2010, with nine more destinations announced: Ankara, Aleppo, Bangalore, Barcelona, Brussels, Bucharest, Budapest, Buenos Aires, Copenhagen, Hanoi, Montreal, Nice, Phuket, São Paulo, Shiraz, Kolkata, Medina, Oslo, Sofia, Stuttgart, Venice and Tokyo. Qatar Airways also launched Benghazi and Entebbe during 2011. Service to Baku and Tbilisi, originally planned for 2011, was delayed until February 1, 2012, due to "operational issues".

Boeing handover of a Boeing 777-200LR in  marked Qatar Airways receiving its  aircraft from this aircraft manufacturer. In November the same year, at the Dubai Airshow, the airline ordered 55 Airbus planes: 50 A320neo and 5 A380, in addition to two Boeing 777 freighters.

In , Perth became the second city served in Australia. On October 8, 2012, Qatar Airways announced it would join Oneworld within the forthcoming 18 months. The entrance of the carrier into the alliance was mentored by British Airways.

On  Qatar Airways became the  carrier worldwide to acquire the Dreamliner, when Boeing handed over the airline first aircraft of the type; it was the first delivered to a Middle Eastern airline. The aircraft was deployed on the Doha–Dubai corridor on Nov. 20 Dreamliner services on the long-haul Doha–London-Heathrow route commenced on Dec 13, with the airline becoming the first one to offer regular services to the United Kingdom using this aircraft. During , Qatar Airways launched flights to Gassim in Saudi Arabia, Basra and Najaf in Iraq, Phnom Penh, Salalah and Chicago.

In February 2013, Qatar Airways opened its European Customer Service centre, which is in Wrocław, Poland.

In , the airline firmed up an order for  Boeing 777-300ER aircraft plus  options. On November 17, 2013, the first day of the Dubai Airshow, Qatar Airways purchased 50 Boeing 777-9Xs. The commitment was firmed up during the 2014 Farnborough Air Show in a deal worth  billion; purchase rights for another  aircraft of the type were also taken. In addition, the transaction included firm orders for  Boeing 777Fs plus options for another  with a combined value of  billion. Deliveries of the passenger aircraft are expected to start in .In 2013, The Economist claimed that "a perusal of online forums used by cabin crew suggests that Qatar has a reputation for severity among industry professionals, including "allegations of harsh treatment and overbearing scrutiny are commonplace", and that "the conditions laid down by Qatar Airways go beyond more familiar rules ... the employee can be fired if she becomes pregnant (which she is contractually obliged to disclose 'from the date of her knowledge of its occurrence')". The airways' CEO Akbar Al Baker has previously stated, "We are not running an intelligence agency, we are an airline company. The reason why I know everything happening in the company is ... I'm simply everywhere, talking to everyone, listening to them".

In 2014, the Swedish newspaper Expressen published a report ostensibly based around three Qatar Airways employees, whose lives were allegedly heavily "monitored" and "controlled" by the company.
Qatar Airways' Swedish PR agency responded to the report by stating, "Because we do not know which individuals and which particular cases the article is based on, Qatar Airways is unable to comment". CEO Akbar Al Baker stated that the allegations "are not against [the company] but against [Qatar]". He added, "They are throwing stones at my country for no reason at all".

The International Transport Workers’ Federation (ITF) has "slammed" Qatar Airways for certain stipulations found in the standard hiring contracts for female cabin crew members, including the need to apply for permission before getting married. The ITF has lobbied the International Civil Aviation Organization to "take action" on what ITF termed “flagrant abuses of aviation workers’ labour rights" by carriers based in Qatar and the UAE. 

There were intentions to first deploy the type on the Doha–London-Heathrow route starting jun 17; another two undisclosed European points would likely become served with the A380. In late , it was reported the delivery of the aircraft would be delayed by several weeks.

In August 2015, Qatar Airways was forced to relax its policy of sacking cabin crew for getting pregnant or marrying in their first five years of employment. A spokeswoman stated, “our policies have evolved with the airline's growth”. Under the new regulations, “we will provide an opportunity for someone to continue working in a ground position”, the spokeswoman said.

In , the airline concluded an order for  Boeing 777Fs in a deal worth  billion; Qatar Airways also took purchase rights on  more aircraft of the type. In , it was disclosed Qatar Airways ordered ten Boeing 777-8Xs and four additional Boeing 777Fs for US$4.18 billion.

In , the carrier received its first Boeing 747 nose loader.

In 2016, American Airlines, Delta Air Lines, and United Airlines claimed that their forensic investigators had uncovered documents that allegedly indicated that Qatar Airways had received more than $7 billion in aid from the Qatari government. 

According to reports, the investigation was conducted by Wilmer Cutler Pickering Hale and Dorr LLP. In July 2016, the U.S. Department of State held talks with Qatar government officials regarding the allegations of unfair competition. No formal action was taken by the Department of State. Qatar Airways has denied allegations that subsidies were received and Qatar Airways CEO Akbar Al Baker condemned the accusations.

As of 5 February 2017, the airline had the longest regularly scheduled flight of a commercial airline, between Doha and Auckland.

In , it was announced that Qatar Airways bought 49% of AQA Holding, the new shareholder of Meridiana.

In November 2018, the airline announced it would expand its flights to Iran, landing at Tehran and Shiraz, as of January 2019, and to Isfahan in February.

In December 2018, the CEO of Qatar Airways, Akbar Al Baker, threatened to pull the company out of the Oneworld alliance in February, following accusations that alliance members Qantas and American Airlines engaged in "hostile business practices" against his carrier.

In 2018, during an annual meeting of the International Air Transport Association, the CEO of Qatar Airways, Akbar Al Baker, claimed that a woman could not do his job as “it is a very challenging position.” Upon receiving backlash regarding his comments, Al Baker explained that he did not intend to refer to all women at Qatar Airways. He also mentioned that he would love to have a female CEO running the company after him. Since then, Al Baker has apologized for his comments in a statement that was provided to The Independent.

On April 30, 2019, Qatar Airways retired its last Airbus A340-600 from service after around 16 years of service. The last flight was QR835 from Bangkok Suvarnabhumi International Airport to Hamad International Airport. The removal from service was to lower the age of its fleet as well as its ineffectiveness compared to the Boeing 777 as stated by CEO Akbar Al Baker in 2009.

On 29 September 2022, The Times published an article stating the death of British travel industry executive, Marc Bennett, in Qatar. On 24 December 2019, Bennett was found hanged in hotel of Doha. According to the investigation by The Times, Bennett was arrested after resigning from a senior post with Qatar Airways for a rival firm in Saudi Arabia. Qatar Airways told The Times - "On 15 October Marc left the business and evidence subsequently came to light showing that over a significant period of time Marc had emailed highly confidential documents relating to Qatar Airways to a private email address without authorization. Marc was still in Qatar at the point this discovery was made. He was arrested and this then became a police matter." However, Qatari authorities claimed that he had committed suicide and Qatar airways stated - “Marc Bennett was a valued and popular former colleague of Qatar airways group. He left with our best wishes.”

Corporate affairs

Key people 
 the Qatar Airways' CEO is Akbar Al Baker, who has been serving in this position since . Baker is also a member of the Heathrow Airport board.

Ownership and subsidiaries 
, the company is fully owned by the Qatari government. Qatar Airways has been fully controlled by the government since , following the buyout of a 50% stake from a former foreign minister and other shareholders. , the Qatar Airways Group employed more than 45,000 people, of whom 32,000 worked directly for the airline. Qatar Airways has been described as an example of "soft power" diplomacy by the authoritarian government in Qatar to rebrand the state. Human rights organizations have criticized Qatar Airways for its relationship with the Qatari state, citing the poor human rights record in Qatar. Qatar Airways is as of February 2020 the largest shareholder in International Airlines Group (IAG) with 25.1% of the shares.

Divisions 
Qatar Airways has many divisions including:
Qatar Aircraft Catering Company, Doha International Airport, Qatar Airways Holidays, United Media Int, Qatar Duty Free, Qatar Aviation Services, Qatar Distribution Company, and Qatar Executive.

Cargo

Qatar Airways Cargo, the airline freight branch, is the world's third largest international cargo carrier. Dedicated cargo flights to Cairo International Airport were launched in June 2009 complementing the passenger services already operated.

On August 18, 2010, the airline launched its first US dedicated cargo service from its hub in Doha to Chicago-O'Hare with a stop-over in Amsterdam, Netherlands using Boeing 777 freighter aircraft.

On March 13, 2013, Qatar Airways Cargo first of three A330F was delivered provided on lease from BOC aviation replacing A300-600F.

Global Supply Systems operated three Boeing 747-8F aircraft under a wet lease arrangement for British Airways World Cargo until BA terminated the contract early on January 17, 2014. An agreement with Qatar Airways to operate flights for IAG Cargo using Boeing 777F was announced on the same day.

On March 18, 2015, Qatar Airways Cargo announced that starting April 4, 2015, will launch a twice-weekly Boeing 777 Freighter service to Los Angeles which will become Qatar Airways Cargo's fourth US freighter destination alongside Houston, Chicago and Atlanta.

On December 27, 2016, Qatar Airways Cargo has announced that it will launch freighter operations to four new destinations in the Americas, Boeing 777 freighters will fly twice a week to the South American cities of Buenos Aires, São Paulo, Quito and the North American city of Miami starting 2 February 2017.

Qatar Executive
Qatar Executive is a corporate jet subsidiary of Qatar Airways, with its livery sporting a white fuselage with a slightly smaller Oryx painted in the airline's traditional colours of burgundy and grey.

The Royal fleet of Qatar Amiri Flight is also painted in full Qatar Airways livery, although they are not part of the airline or Qatar Executive.

Al Maha Airways
Al Maha Airways was a proposed airline based in Saudi Arabia, later based in Qatar, is fully owned by Qatar Airways. It used a similar livery, except in green instead of burgundy. It was planned to launch in September 2014 and by May 2015 the airline had already taken delivery of 4 Airbus A320 aircraft.

In February 2017, Qatar Airways announced that the Al Maha Airways project had been cancelled and the airline would not start operations due to ongoing issues gaining its operational license and the Qatar diplomatic crisis.

Livery
Qatar Airways has an oryx, the national animal of the State of Qatar, as its logo. The aircraft decor includes the word Qatar appearing in burgundy-coloured letters on a light grey background at both sides of the forward part of the fuselage with the word Al Qataria in Arabic titles appearing close to it in a darker grey and a smaller typeface. A burgundy oryx in a grey background adorns the tailfin. The airline unveiled this branding in 2006.

Natural gas to liquid fuel demonstration
On October 12, 2009, a Qatar Airways Airbus A340-600 conducted the world's first commercial passenger flight using a mixture of kerosene and synthetic gas-to-liquids (GTL) fuel, produced from natural gas, on its flight from London's Gatwick Airport to Doha. The experiment's purpose was to demonstrate the viability of jet fuel made from a source not subject to rapidly fluctuating oil prices. Also, positioning natural gas in particular as an alternative source of jet fuel is in the interests of the Qatari government; Qatar is the world's leading exporter of natural gas. However, some experts believe that GTL fuel is likely to remain a marginal choice due to an expensive production process.

Sponsorships

 Qatar Airways has sponsored weather forecasts on Sky News since August 2005.
 In July 2013, Qatar Airways became FC Barcelona's primary shirt sponsor. This sponsorship ended in 2017.
 In August 2016, Qatar Airways became Official international Airline Sponsor for Sydney Swans.
 In May 2017, Qatar Airways became FIFA Partner, sponsoring all of FIFA tournaments until 2022, part of the four-year deal.
 In May 2017, Qatar Airways became the "Official Airline Partner" for the FIA Formula E Championship for the Paris and New York City races.
 In February 2018, Qatar Airways became FC Bayern Munich’s sleeve sponsor for domestic competitions starting in the 2018-19 season, but then extended to 2025 as part of the seven-year deal.
 In April 2018, Qatar Airways became A.S. Roma's primary shirt sponsor.
 In July 2018, Qatar Airways became Boca Juniors's primary shirt sponsor.
 In August 2018, Qatar Airways became a "prestige partner" and official airline sponsor for the 2018 Asian Games.
 In October 2018, Qatar Airways became the primary sponsor of the CONMEBOL club competitions for the South American market, part of the four-and-half year deal until the 2022 season.
 In November 2019, Qatar Airways became the title sponsor of the Philippines Football League.
 In February 2020, Qatar Airways became the premium partner for Paris Saint-Germain F.C. (PSG) for three seasons until 2022. On 30 June 2022, PSG extended their sponsorship with Qatar Airways for another three seasons until 2025 after taking over Accor on the first team, women's and youth team jerseys.
 In February 2021, Qatar Airways became the sponsor for the UEFA Euro 2020.
 In August 2020, Qatar Airways became the main shirt sponsor of Club Africain of Tunisia from the 2020/21 season until the 2022/23 season.
 In July 2021, Qatar Airways became the sponsor for the CONCACAF national team competitions starting in the 2021 CONCACAF Gold Cup and the 2022-23 CONCACAF Nations League for the Caribbean, Mexican and the North American markets, but then extended to 2024 after first signed in the 2017–20 cycle as part of the four-year deal.
 On 24 August 2022, it was announced that Qatar Airways would sponsor the Egyptian football club Al Ahly SC.
 On 22 February 2023, Formula One announced a partnership with Qatar Airways, replacing Emirates as the Global Airline Partner in a multi-year deal starting from the 2023 season. The partnership includes title sponsorship of three races in the 2023 season.
 On 3 March 2023, Royal Challengers Bangalore (RCB), the Bangalore franchise of the Indian Premier League (IPL), signed Qatar Airways as its title sponsor for three years in a ₹75 crore deal.

Investments
In 2015, they bought 9.99% of the International Airlines Group. Qatar has steadily increased its shareholding since then, and held 25.1% of the shares as at February 2020.

In December 2019, Qatar Airways purchased a 60% stake in Rwanda’s new $1.3 billion international airport, Bugesera International Airport. The MoU signed between Qatar Airways and the Rwandan government read, "The partnership features three agreements to build, own, and operate the state-of-the-art facility."

In February 2020, Qatar Airways acquired a 49% stake in Rwanda's flag carrier airline, RwandAir. The partnership is intended to be beneficial for both the airlines as it would provide technical and financial support to RwandAir for its development and hub strategy, while Qatar Airways would be able to bypass the embargo imposed by neighbouring countries.

Qatar Airways also invests a 10% stake in the LATAM Airlines Group.

They also own a 9.99% stake in Cathay Pacific.

Qatar Airways and jetBlue are minority shareholders in JSX.

Destinations

Qatar Airways flies to over 90 countries on all 6 inhabited continents- including 13 destinations in India and 11 in the United States.

In 2012, fourteen additional destinations were added to the Qatar Airways network: Addis Ababa, Baghdad, Belgrade, Erbil, Gassim, Kigali, Kiliminjaro, Maputo, Mombasa, Perth, Saint Petersburg, Warsaw, Yangon, and Zagreb.

On , the touchdown of a flight from Bahrain at Doha Hamad International Airport marked the official transfer of Qatar Airways' operations to its new hub, replacing Doha International Airport. , Qatar Airways served  points worldwide following the launch of flights to Asmara. The airline had previously added to the route network Dallas/Fort Worth, the carrier's seventh destination in the United States and its second in Texas along with Houston, Tokyo (Haneda), Miami, Edinburgh, its  destination in the United Kingdom, its  point served in Turkey, and Djibouti. Starting , the carrier will serve Amsterdam. Starting December 2015, it was announced that the airline will serve Durban.

In June 2017, all Qatar Airways flights were prevented from entering Emirati, Saudi Arabia, Bahrain and Egyptian airports due to the 2017 diplomatic crisis. All airlines in those countries had already suspended their operations in Qatar's airspace and airports. This ban was in effect until January 2021, when it was lifted.

On 18 June 2019, Qatar Airways launched its first flight from Doha to Davao, Philippines.

On July 1, three months after announcing Doha-Mogadishu flights, Qatar Airways launched its first flight to Somalia.

In August 2019, the company introduced flights to Langkawi, as a part of its expansion plans in Southeast Asia. The route is Qatar Airways' third destination in Malaysia after Kuala Lumpur and Penang.

In September 2020, Qatar Airways suspended flights to both Birmingham Airport and Cardiff Airport due to low demand because of COVID-19 travel restrictions. Flights to Birmingham Airport and Cardiff Airport were scheduled to restart on March 28, 2021, however the flights never restarted.

In January 2021, the embargo was lifted and Qatar Airways was again able to fly to countries such as Saudi Arabia, United Arab Emirates, Egypt and Bahrain and use their respective airspace.

As of January 25, 2021, Qatar Airways' network spreads across 120 destinations after the settlement of Qatar's airspace dispute with neighbouring Gulf countries. The carrier is currently planning to expand its network to reach 130 routes by March 2021.

On July 24, 2021, Qatar Airways resumed service to Cebu after eight years of absence. Cebu, the second largest city in the Philippines, became the third destination in the country to be served by Qatar Airways.

Codeshare agreements
Qatar Airways has codeshare agreements with the following airlines and train systems:

 Air Botswana
 Air Canada
 Air Malta
 Air Serbia
 Alaska Airlines
 American Airlines
 Asiana Airlines
 Azerbaijan Airlines
 Bangkok Airways
 British Airways
 Bulgaria Air
 Cathay Pacific
 China Southern Airlines
 Deutsche Bahn (Railway)
 Finnair
 Gol Transportes Aéreos
 Iberia
 IndiGo
 Japan Airlines
 jetBlue
 LATAM Airlines Group
 Malaysia Airlines
 Middle East Airlines
 Oman Air
 Pegasus Airlines
 Royal Air Maroc
 Royal Jordanian
 RwandAir
 S7 Airlines
 SUN-AIR
 SNCF (Railway)
 SriLankan Airlines
 Virgin Australia
 Vueling

Fleet

Current fleet
, the Qatar Airways fleet consists of the following aircraft:

Note: Though not affiliated with the airline, some VIP aircraft belonging to the royal family and government are also painted in Qatar Airways livery and operate as Qatar Amiri Flight.

Qatar Executive fleet
, the Qatar Executive fleet consists of the following aircraft:

Previously operated

Qatar Airways formerly operated the following aircraft:

Cabin

First class
First class seats are equipped with massage functions and an entertainment system. First class, available only on A380s, features a  seat pitch, transforming into a fully flat bed, together with an expansive choice of entertainment options displayed on individual 26-inch television screens. It is configured as 1-2-1. All new Airbus A350 and Boeing 787 Dreamliner aircraft will be in standard two-class configuration.

Business class

Qatar Airways offers business class passengers fully flat horizontal beds with direct aisle access in a 1-2-1 configuration on board its Airbus A380, Airbus A350, Boeing 777, and Boeing 787 aircraft. On other long and medium-haul aircraft, business class seats are in a 2-2-2 configuration offering flatbed seats with 180 degrees recline, with massage functions.

In March 2017, Qatar Airways revealed a new business class cabin, dubbed "Qsuite.” The new cabin offer suites with doors arranged in a 1-2-1 configuration. Qsuite features single seats on the window sides, and the middle section suites can be converted into a quad room, allowing four passengers to face each other in a dining-room like set up. Additionally, select "couple" seat pairs in the middle section can be converted into a double bed, offering a product similar to what other airlines offer in First Class. Launched on new Boeing 777-300ER and A350 XWB aircraft from summer 2017 and initially introduced on the Doha to London Heathrow route, the new seats will be retrofitted in the remaining fleet progressively, excluding the Airbus A330s and Airbus A380s due to their upcoming retirement of the types beginning in 2019 and 2024 as Qatar Airways introduced the Airbus A350, Boeing 787, and Boeing 777X to replace them.

Economy class

Qatar Airways economy class was named best in the world in the 2009 and 2010 Skytrax Awards. Economy class passengers on A330 aircraft are offered individual seat-back TV screens. Passengers on Airbus A350, A380, Boeing 777 and 787 aircraft are offered touch-screen IFE monitors.

Qatar Airways has taken delivery of several A320 family aircraft so far with individual seat-back personal televisions in every seat in economy class. The IFE is equipped with the same Thales entertainment system as used in the widebody fleet. A further four A321s and the two A319LRs will be equipped with the new IFE, as well as new upcoming A320 family aircraft deliveries.

New economy seats will be introduced with the launch of the 787. These new seats will be produced by Recaro and are fitted in a 3-3-3 configuration.  of width and a pitch of  will offer less personal space than before. Furthermore, each seat will have a 10.6 inch in-seat 
LED monitor offering in-flight entertainment. The features will also extend to the possibility of Wi-Fi and GSM telephony usage and USB ports for connecting personal items such as digital cameras.

In-flight entertainment
Qatar Airways' in-flight entertainment system is called Oryx One. With the exception of some Airbus A320 family aircraft, all aircraft have personal seat-back Info-tainment screens. Some Airbus A320 family aircraft are fitted with main screen entertainment. Qatar is updating Airbus A320 family aircraft to seat-back AVOD. Qatar Airways also offers Onboard Connectivity Wi-Fi, which allows passengers to send SMS and MMS, access email, and browse the internet. This service is available on all A380, A350, B777, B787, A319, and select A320, A321, and A330 aircraft.

Privilege Club
Qatar Airways' Privilege Club loyalty program allows members to accumulate Avios miles from flying (on Qatar Airways and oneworld airline partners) and non-airline partners, as well as allows 1:1 transfer of Avios miles from Avios programs of British Airways, Iberia and Aer Lingus. Privilege Club will also award Qpoints for segments flew on Qatar Airways and oneworld partner airlines, reaching certain level of Qpoints in one year allows the member (the base membership level is Burgundy) to be awarded oneworld Ruby (Silver), Sapphire (Gold) or Emerald (Platinum) status, which comes with benefits of lounge access, complimentary upgrades and extra baggage limits.

Lounges
After full operations commenced at its new hub, Doha in 2014, the Al Mourjan Business Lounge for Qatar Airways’ premium passengers opened in July 2014. Access to the Al Mourjan Business Lounge is for Qatar Airways and Oneworld first-class and business-class passengers only.

In 2015 Qatar Airways opened the Al Safwa First Lounge for its first-class passengers.

The airline's first lounge outside Doha opened at London Heathrow's Terminal 4 in January 2012 and Qatar Airways opened its new Premium Lounge at Dubai-International's Concourse D in April 2016. In January 2017, Qatar Airways opened its new premium lounge within Terminal 1 at Charles de Gaulle Airport.

Incidents
 19 April 2007: An Airbus A300, registration A7-ABV, was written off as a result of a hangar fire during maintenance at Abu Dhabi Aircraft Technologies.
 8 December 2017: An Airbus A321-231 registration A7-AIB was damaged beyond economic repair by a fire at Hamad International Airport, Doha.

See also 
 Transport in Qatar
 Human rights in Qatar

Notes

References

External links 

 
  of Qatar Executive
  of Oryx In-flight Magazine

 
Airlines established in 1993
Airlines of Qatar
Arab Air Carriers Organization members
Government-owned airlines
Government-owned companies of Qatar
Qatari brands
Qatari companies established in 1993